Mandy Miller (born Carmen Isabella Miller in 1944) is an English child actress who made a number of films in the 1950s. She is also remembered for her recording of the 1956 song "Nellie the Elephant".

Early life
Carmen Isabella Miller, known professionally as Mandy Miller, was born in 1944.

In 1962, at the age of 18, Miller gave up acting and moved to New York City to become an au pair.

Career
Her career tended to involve serious acting roles rather than comedy, even in her first small part in The Man in the White Suit, where she was a sad-faced little girl who helped Alec Guinness escape from his pursuers.

She put in a much-praised performance in her second film, another Ealing production, Mandy (1952), playing a deaf-mute child whose parents (played by Terence Morgan and Phyllis Calvert) did not know how to cope with bringing her up. This briefly made her a leading actress.

Her next film was Background (1953), with two other child actors, in a film about a family breaking up because of an impending divorce. Like Mandy, this was a drama about a well-to-do middle-class family; Valerie Hobson played her mother.

In 1954, she had a starring role in Adventure in the Hopfields, a film made for the Children's Film Foundation.

She also had lighter roles, such as in Raising a Riot (1955) starring Kenneth More. Some of her other co-stars were Joan Greenwood, Cecil Parker, Godfrey Tearle, Thora Hird and Sam Wanamaker.

Miller made two popular single records: "Snowflakes" and "Nellie the Elephant", the latter produced by George Martin.

She also appeared in television dramas.

Personal life
Miller's sister is the actress Jan Miller, and her niece actress Amanda Pays.

In 1965, she married Christopher Davey, an architect, and had three children.

Filmography
 The Man in the White Suit (1951) Gladdie
 I Believe In You (1952) Child
 Mandy (1952) Mandy
 Background (1953) Linda Lomax
 Adventure in the Hopfields (1954) Jenny Quin
 Dance Little Lady (1954) Jill Gordon
 The Secret (1955) Katie Martin
 Raising a Riot (1955) Anne Kent
 The Feminine Touch (1956) Jessie
 Child in the House (1956) Elizabeth Lorimer
 The Snorkel (1958) Candy Brown

References

External links

1944 births
Living people
Actresses from Somerset
English film actresses
English soap opera actresses
English television actresses
People from Weston-super-Mare
English child actresses
English women singers
English child singers
English expatriates in the United States
Parlophone artists
EMI Records artists